Kopperå Station is a railway station on the Meråker Line in the village of Kopperå in the municipality of Meråker in Trøndelag county, Norway. The station was opened on 1 April 1899 as Kopperaasen. It was renamed Kopperåen in April 1924. It received the current name on 1 September 1925.

The station is served twice a day in each direction by SJ Norge. The building is owned by Bane NOR.

References

Railway stations in Meråker
Railway stations on the Meråker Line
Railway stations opened in 1899
1899 establishments in Norway